Lester Stefan Peltier (born 13 September 1988) is a Trinidadian international footballer who plays as a forward .

Career

Club
Peltier attended St. Anthony's College in Trinidad playing on his school's football team as the striker position. and had trials with Club Brugge, Arsenal, Millwall and Cardiff City. In 2007, English Premiership club Portsmouth offered Peltier a four-year contract after a successful trial, but could not conclude the deal due to his failure to attain a work permit. In April 2011 he signed with AS Trenčín and made his debut on 10 April 2011. On 19 June 2012, Slovan Bratislava confirmed the signing of Peltier from AS Trenčín on a four-year contract.

On 7 February 2016, Peltier signed for Irtysh Pavlodar of the Kazakhstan Premier League. Little over a week later, Peltier and Irtysh Pavlodar agreed to cancel his contract by mutual consent due to family circumstances.

On 30 July 2018, Peltier re-joined Alashkert, but left the club 6-weeks later to join Saudi second tier club Al-Mujazzal.

International
He also represented Trinidad and Tobago at the Under 17, Under 20 levels and played for Scorpion United scoring 6 goals. Peltier made his international debut for the Trinidad and Tobago national football team on 26 January 2008 against Puerto Rico coming on as a substitute in the 46th minute. Peltier scored his first international hat-trick at the Hasley Crawford Stadium in October 2011 during a World Cup qualifier.

He announced his international retirement on June 7, 2021.

Personal life
Lester's brother, Johan, is also a professional footballer, currently playing for Junior Sevan.

Career statistics

Club

International

Statistics accurate as of match played 8 January 2016

International goals
Scores and results list Trinidad and Tobago's goal tally first.

Honours
Slovan Bratislava
 Slovak Super Liga (2): 2012–13, 2013–14
 Slovak Cup (1): 2012–13

External links
Slovan Bratislava profile
AS Trenčín profile

References

Trinidad and Tobago footballers
Trinidad and Tobago expatriate footballers
Trinidad and Tobago youth international footballers
Trinidad and Tobago international footballers
Living people
1988 births
San Juan Jabloteh F.C. players
Ma Pau Stars S.C. players
TT Pro League players
AS Trenčín players
ŠK Slovan Bratislava players
FC Alashkert players
Al-Mujazzal Club players
Al-Orobah FC players
Al-Taqadom FC players
Slovak Super Liga players
Armenian Premier League players
Saudi First Division League players
2014 Caribbean Cup players
2015 CONCACAF Gold Cup players
Expatriate footballers in Slovakia
Expatriate footballers in Kazakhstan
Expatriate footballers in Armenia
Expatriate footballers in Saudi Arabia
Trinidad and Tobago expatriate sportspeople in Slovakia
Trinidad and Tobago expatriate sportspeople in Kazakhstan
Trinidad and Tobago expatriate sportspeople in Armenia
Trinidad and Tobago expatriate sportspeople in Saudi Arabia
Association football forwards
Association football midfielders
2019 CONCACAF Gold Cup players
Trinidad and Tobago under-20 international footballers